NGC 3003 is a nearly edge-on barred spiral galaxy in the constellation of Leo Minor, discovered by William Herschel on December 7, 1785. It has an apparent visual magnitude of 11.78, at a distance of 19.5 Mpc from the Sun. It has a recessional velocity of 1474 km/s.

In 1961, a type II supernova with an apparent magnitude of 13.0 was detected within the galaxy, and was subsequently designated SN 1961F.

References

External links 
 

Astronomical objects discovered in 1785
Discoveries by William Herschel
Galaxies discovered in 1785
3003
Barred spiral galaxies
Leo Minor
028186